Big Brother 2010 is the sixth season of the Finnish reality television season Big Brother. The open auditions for the season were held in April 2010. The season premiered on Sub on 25 August 2010 and the finale was aired on 28 November 2010.

Big Brother Talk Show was hosted by Susanna Laine and Elina Viitanen. Elina Viitanen was also the hostess of Big Brother Extra. This was the first season not been hosted by Vappu Pimiä.

Housemates

Eetu
Eetu Karhunen Born in 1988. A paper worker living in Tampere

Elisabet
Elisabet Vuorinen Born in Helsinki in 1988. Working as a Security guard. Living in Espoo.

Elli-Maija
Elli-Maija Martikainen Born in 1988. A student living in Vantaa.

Ellinoora
Ellinoora Lehtovaara Born in 1990. Working as a practical nurse in Kuopio.

Esa-Tapio
Esa-Tapio Palmu Born in 1983 in Kouvola. Working as a youth leader.

Habib
Habib Mohseni Born in Kabul, Afghanistan in 1990. A student living in Nokia, Finland.

Hannu
Hannu Mikkola Born in 1986. A student living in Porvoo, Finland.

Henna
Henna Kalinainen was a housemate in Big Brother 2008. Born in 1989, living in Kerava

Inka
Inka Tuominen Born in 1990. A student living in Vantaa and former contestant of Suomen huippumalli haussa (season 2)

Jani T.
Jani Tenhunen Born in 1978. Working as a salesman in Helsinki.

Jani Y.
Jani Yliviuhkola (born in 1987). Living in Helsinki.

Ksenia
Ksenia Suokas (born in Saint Petersburg, Russia in 1990). A student living in Jyväskylä, Finland.

Mari
Mari Luhtavaara Born in Hämeenlinna in 1992. At the moment living in Helsinki. Working as a bartender.

Maria
Maria Kalho (born in Jyväskylä in 1988). At the moment living in Helsinki. Working as a promoter.

Marianna
Marianna Zaikova was a housemate in Big Brother 2008, where she was ejected for undisclosed personal reasons. Born in 1985, living in Helsinki.

Marika
Marika Eerola (born in 1987). A student living in Helsinki.

Mia
Mia Mäkipää (born in 1990). A student living in Helsinki.

Niko N.
Niko Nousiainen was a housemate in Big Brother 2007. Born in 1983, living in Helsinki.
He was the winner of Big Brother 2010.

Niko S.
Niko Saarinen was a housemate in Big Brother 2008, where he was ejected for violence. Born in 1986, living in Kerava.

Nino
Nino Hermas was a housemate in Big Brother 2009, where he was ejected for sexual misconduct.
Born in 1979, living in Helsinki.

Noora
Noora Kokkola Born in 1988. Working as a saleswoman in Turku.

Paul
Paul Puolakka (born in 1984 in Oulu).

Petri
Petri Tiainen Born in 1985. Living in Kuopio.

Riikka
Riikka Haahkola Born in 1986. Working in a coffee shop in Kouvola

Satu
Satu Tuisku (born in Kurikka, Southern Ostrobothnia in 1970). Working as a telemarketer.

Vilhelmiina
Vilhelmiina Noronen Born in 1986. Working as a bartender in Jyväskylä.

Ville
Ville Kinnunen Born in 1990. Living in Leppävirta.

Nominations table

Notes

External links
Official Website 

2010 Finnish television seasons
06